Bryansk International Airport  is an airport in Bryansk Oblast in western Russia. A military airfield was first built at the site in 1927 and it became a civil airport for refuelling in 1934 and an official airport in 1961. In September 1995 it became an international airport.

Facilities

Airlines and destinations

References

External links
 Official site 
 
 

Bryansk
Airports in Bryansk Oblast